Xerophytacolus is a genus of Cicadellidae (leafhopper) in the tribe Opsiini and the subfamily Deltocephalinae. It was described in 2012 by Stiller, and is found in southern Africa.

Species 
Are there two known species of Xerophytacolus:
Xerophytacolus claviverpus 
Xerophytacolus tubuverpus

References

Cicadellidae genera
Opsiini